Valentin Areh (born August 22, 1971) is a Slovenian journalist, war correspondent and writer.  Currently he works for several international media organisations.

Born in the Slovenian capital Ljubljana, he participated in 1991 as a soldier in the brief Slovenian war of independence.  He subsequently attended Ljubljana University, studying history and sociology.   He concluded his studies at Ljubljana by obtaining a Master's degree covering certain sociological aspects of the US electoral system.

Areh has fifteen years of experience as a war correspondent in places such as Croatia, Bosnia, Kosovo, Chechnya, Afghanistan and Iraq. He was one of the few journalists to remain in Kosovo during the Kosovo War of 1999 and he survived a tortuous escape out of the country during NATO’s war to expel Serbian forces. He has worked with AP, Reuters, Italia Uno, Media set, 24ur and he is the author of several books.

Bibliography
Areh has written several books, including:
Afghanistan: Stories of War Correspondent (2002);
Saddam Hussein al Tikriti (2004); 
Blood in the Desert Sand (2004).

External links

1971 births
Journalists from Ljubljana
Living people
Writers from Ljubljana
Slovenian military personnel
Slovenian war correspondents
University of Ljubljana alumni